2 Cool 4 Skool is the debut single album released by South Korean boy band BTS on June 12, 2013 through Big Hit Entertainment and distributed by Loen. The album was supported by the singles "No More Dream" and "We Are Bulletproof Pt.2". Commercially, it peaked at number five on the Gaon Album Chart in South Korea, and at number ten on Billboards World Albums Chart in the United States. The album has sold over 430,000 copies as of January 2022.

A 3-disc version of the album was released in Japan through Pony Canyon in 2014.

Background and release
Prior to BTS' debut, Big Hit Entertainment ran a blog for the group where the members shared mixtapes, diary entries, video logs, and various other content with their fans. The label announced a temporary closure of the blog on May 20, 2013, in preparation for the group's debut. BTS' official website was launched that same day and featured a countdown timer on the homepage—counting down to May 27 (KST)—with the group's official logo revealed for the first time. On May 26 (May 27 at 8AM KST), a 30-second long debut trailer was posted on the website and uploaded to Big Hit's official YouTube channel as well. The clip featured a hip-hop beat with Scratching and a "well-crafted rap hook" that accompanied typography graphics containing hints about the group's composition, the songs that would be on their first album, and the musical direction BTS would pursue. The timer on the website changed and began counting down to June 3. On June 3, the release date for the album and its as-yet-unnamed lead single, as well as the start date for promotional activities was announced as June 12. Teaser photos of the individual members were published on the group's website beginning that same day and continued sequentially until June 5. Big Hit revealed the tracklist for the album on their official Twitter account. They also released the design and details of the physical album which included with a photobook and postcard. The first teaser, revealing that "No More Dream" would be their title track. Additional concept photos for the album were released via their official Facebook page the following week.

Music videos
The music video for "No More Dream" was released on June 12, 2013 ahead of BTS debut showcase. "No More Dream" dance version was later released on June 16, 2013 in the middle of the group's promotion on music programs. The music video for "We Are Bulletproof Pt.2" was then released on July 16, 2013 for the group's further follow-up promotions. All the dance was choreographed by Son Sungdeuk while both "No More Dream" and "We Are Bulletproof Pt.2" music videos were directed by Zanybros.

Composition
The lyrics of the album primarily reflected on the misunderstanding and prejudice towards them, criticism of the society that diminishes their dreams, and their anxiety and determination towards their future. During the production of the album, Suga and RM rewrote the lyrics of "No More Dream" more than 20 times.

Promotions
The group held a press conference and debut showcase on June 12, 2013, performing "No More Dream" and "We Are Bulletproof Pt.2", marked their unofficial debut stage in South Korea music industry. BTS later made a successful debut stage on June 13 on Mnet's M Countdown marked the start of their promotion of the album on various South Korea music programs. Much later in 2015, BTS held a special concert in support of the album. 2015 BTS Live Trilogy Episode I: BTS Begins was held for two days at Olympic Hall starting from March 28, 2015 with BTS performing songs from 2 Cool 4 Skool & O!RUL8,2? albums.

Commercial performance
2 Cool 4 Skool sold 760 copies in its release week, and debuted at number 19 on the Week 25 issue of the Gaon Album Chart for the period dated June 9–15, 2013. The album went on to sell a cumulative 4,986 copies in the weeks following and debuted at number 17 on the monthly Album Chart for June. Six weeks later, it peaked at number five on the Week 31 chart issue for the period dated July 21–27, during "We Are Bulletproof Pt.2" promotions, and subsequently rose to a new peak on the monthly chart for July at number 10, with a further 13,598 copies sold. The album sold a modest 24,441 copies in total and earned a placement on Gaon's year-end album chart for 2013 at number 65. In April 2020, the album made its debut on the Billboard World Albums Chart—fans purchased the album as part of an in-fandom April Fools' Day joke that anticipated "the 'debut' of a 'new' boy band called BTS coming on April 1"—at number 12, with 1,000 equivalent album units sold during the week ending April 2. According to Billboard, 2 Cool 4 Skool had earned 68,000 units in the United States as of April 11.

The album's lead single "No More Dream" also debuted on the Week 25 issues (for the same period as above) of Gaon's Digital and Download charts at numbers 124 and 84 respectively, with 23,237 sales. In the US, it debuted at number 14 on the Billboard World Digital Song Sales chart issue dated June 29, 2013, and spent three consecutive weeks on the ranking. In 2020, the single also reentered the chart, on the issue dated April 11, at a new peak of number two, with an additional 1,000 copies sold— its best single sales week on the ranking—and became the best-selling K-pop song in the US that week. According to Billboard, "No More Dream" had sold a total of 45,000 copies in the country up to that point.

Track listing
Adapted from the Korea Music Copyright Association database, unless otherwise noted.

Personnel

RM – rapper, songwriter, chorus
Jin – vocalist
Suga – rapper, songwriter, recording
J-Hope – rapper, songwriter
Jimin – vocalist
V – vocalist
Jungkook – vocal, sub rapper, chorus
Pdogg – producer, recording, keyboard, synthesizer, vocal and rap arrangement
"Hitman" Bang – producer, songwriter, executive producer

Slow Rabbit – producer, songwriter, recording, keyboard, synthesizer
Supreme Boi – producer, recording, keyboard, synthesizer, chorus
DJ Scratch – scratching
Yang Chang Won – mixing, recording
James F. Reynolds – mixing
Nam Young Woo – recording
Chris Gehringer – mixing
Choi Hyo Young – mixing

Charts

Weekly charts

Monthly charts

Yearly charts

Sales and certifications

Release history

See also
 List of K-pop songs on the Billboard charts
 New artist awards received by BTS

References

External links
 ibighit "No More Dream" Music Video
 ibighit "We Are Bulletproof Pt.2" Music Video

BTS albums
2013 albums
Korean-language albums
Hybe Corporation albums
Single albums